

381001–381100 

|-id=048
| 381048 Werber ||  || Bernard Werber (born 1961) is a French science fiction writer. Werber's writing style mixes literary genres, including saga, science fiction and philosophical ideas. His most famous work is the trilogy Les Fourmis (The Ants). || 
|}

381101–381200 

|-bgcolor=#f2f2f2
| colspan=4 align=center | 
|}

381201–381300 

|-id=260
| 381260 Ouellette ||  || John A. Ouellette (born 1968) is currently an operations manager at the National Research Council of Canada and an authority on blue straggler stars. || 
|}

381301–381400 

|-id=323
| 381323 Fanjinshi ||  || Fan Jinshi (born 1938), the honorable dean of Dunhuang Academy, made great contribution to the archaeology survey and conservation of Chinese grottoes. She constructed "Digital Dunhuang" and a comprehensive protection system, which provides a model for the protection of world cultural heritage. || 
|}

381401–381500 

|-id=458
| 381458 Moiseenko ||  || Vladimir Mikhailovich Moiseenko (born 1955), Professor Doctor of medical sciences, is Director of the Oncological center in St. Petersburg. || 
|}

381501–381600 

|-bgcolor=#f2f2f2
| colspan=4 align=center | 
|}

381601–381700 

|-bgcolor=#f2f2f2
| colspan=4 align=center | 
|}

381701–381800 

|-bgcolor=#f2f2f2
| colspan=4 align=center | 
|}

381801–381900 

|-bgcolor=#f2f2f2
| colspan=4 align=center | 
|}

381901–382000 

|-id=904
| 381904 Beatita ||  || Beata Tidmarsh, née Podolská (born 1966) was a longtime colleague of Slovak discoverer Stefan Kürti, who encouraged his devotion to astronomy || 
|}

References 

381001-382000